Shamrock Independent School District is a public school district based in Shamrock, Texas (USA).  Located in Wheeler County, a small portion of the district extends into Collingsworth County.

On July 1, 1991, Lela Independent School District stopped operations, and Shamrock ISD, along with Samnorwood Independent School District, educated Lela ISD students until that district was formally merged into Shamrock ISD on July 1, 1992.

Schools
Shamrock ISD has three campuses -

Shamrock High School (Grades 9-12), 
Shamrock Middle School (Grades 6-8), and 
Shamrock Elementary School (Grades PK-5).

In 2009, the school district was rated "academically acceptable" by the Texas Education Agency.

References

External links
Shamrock ISD

School districts in Wheeler County, Texas
School districts in Collingsworth County, Texas